Premier ECDE teachers college is an accredited Institution of high learning by the Government of Rwanda. It started in 2013 with 3 objectives:
To provide education geared toward the development of the child's mental, physical and spiritual growth.
To provide accessible, affordable and quality childhood education to teachers
To promote the national goals and objectives of Early Childhood Development Education to Rwanda.

In 2017 the school was visited by the First Lady Jeannette Kagame.

References

Universities in Rwanda